Garland is an unincorporated community in Warren County, Pennsylvania, United States. Garland has a post office with ZIP code 16416.

References

Unincorporated communities in Warren County, Pennsylvania
Unincorporated communities in Pennsylvania